FC Vovchansk is a Ukrainian football club from Vovchansk. The club represents a local machine-building and equipment factory. Vovchansk is a Ukrainian adaption and official name of the city where the club is from, while the club calls itself only in Russian manner Volchansk. In June 2021, the club was admitted to the Second League, yet still in March no such plans existed.

History 
The club was created in 1992. It was not until 1996 when the club made to top flight of the Kharkiv Oblast football championship (regional level). Its first notable achievement came in 2003 when Vovchansk became the 3rd place runner-up of regional competition. Yet it was only since 2017 that the club became a real contender for the regional title and started to participate in the national amateur competitions. In 2019–20 and 2020–21 AAFU championships it placed 2nd in the Group 3 and qualifying for the AAFU main league's title. During the 2020–21 season for some time Vovchansk was a group leader, but at finish yielded to Motor Zaporizhia of Chantsev. During this time the club's main team was managed by Andriy Berezovchuk who also performed functions of sports director in both Vovchansk and Metal Kharkiv. In 2021 Berezovchuk officially left the post of sports director in Metal that later transformed into Metalist.

Honours 
 Ukrainian Amateur Cup
 Runners-up (1): 2018–19
 Kharkiv Oblast Championship
 Winner (2): 2018, 2019
 Runners-up (1): 2017
 Kharkiv Oblast Cup
 Runners-up (2): 2004, 2017

Current squad

Head coaches 
 2017 – 2019 Andriy Berezovchuk
 2019 – 2020 Vitaliy Komarnytskyi
 2020 – present Andriy Berezovchuk (also a sports director in both Vovchansk and Metal Kharkiv (2020–21))

References

External links 
 Official website
 Profile. footballfacts.ru

 
Association football clubs established in 1992
1992 establishments in Ukraine
Football clubs in Kharkiv Oblast
Ukrainian Second League clubs
Sport in Kharkiv